David Gibson is a Canadian pop-rock singer. He received a Juno Award nomination for Most Promising Male Vocalist in 1987.

Career 
Shortly after leaving school, Gibson toured Canada and Europe with various bands and began writing songs with Robert Uhrig. In the mid 1980s, after recording a six-track demo of original songs written with Uhrig, Gibson was offered a recording deal with Loose End Records in London. The company subsequently dissolved during contract negotiations. 

Upon returning to Canada, Gibson met guitarist/producer Domenic Troiano. Gibson signed with Troiano's Black Market label, and "Lock Up My Heart" was recorded and released in the summer of 1986. The single was accompanied by a video directed by Stephen Reynolds. Gibson went on to win the Juno Award nomination in March 1987 .

In 1988, Black Market/A&M Records issued Gibson's self-titled album. The album's singles received modest radio airplay, as did the videos for tracks such as "Easy Street," "Lying to Me" and "We Close Our Eyes," which were played on Canada's national music station, MuchMusic and CBC's Video Hits. The album was supported by a cross-Canada tour.

The follow-up release,"Rhythm Method," came out on Black Market Records in early 1990. However, the A&M distribution deal was no longer in place, and the album had minimal impact.

Over the next few years, Gibson's music was featured heavily on several TV shows across the US, Canada, the UK and France.

In 1996, "I Don't Know", a Gibson/Uhrig-penned song that was recorded by Escapade from Chicago. Several DJ's issued various mixes of the track and it became a breakout hit, particularly in dance clubs, during the summer of 1997. The track charted in Billboard Magazine and appeared on several dance mix compilations. 

Gibson released an album of new songs, "Life Lines" in December 2020.

References

Canadian pop singers
Canadian rock singers
Canadian male singers
Musicians from Toronto
Living people
Year of birth missing (living people)